Scaredycat (Pilar Lisieux) is a fictional character, a superhero in the Marvel Universe, member of the Strikeforce: Morituri. The character was created by Peter B. Gillis and Brent Anderson.

Publication history
Scaredycat was created by writer Peter B. Gillis and artist Brent Anderson. She had a cameo appearance in Strikeforce: Morituri #5, in the shadows, before making her first full appearance in #6. Subsequently, she joined the cast of Strikeforce: Morituri in #8, up until her death in #19. Notably, her hair was black in her first full appearance, before the artist settled on brown.

Fictional character biography
Not much is known about Pilar Lisieux, prior to her joining Strikeforce: Morituri. An avid New Age follower, she believed in the existence of spiritual energy in everything and often indulged in meditations, considering herself a mystic. At some point, in 2073, she decided to undergo the Morituri process and assist in the ongoing war of Earth against the formidable alien invaders, known as the Horde. The process was able to grant superhuman abilities to its recipients, proving an invaluable asset in battle. However, it also had a fatal flaw: the recipients of the process could not live more than a year after fully receiving it, because of their organism eventually rejecting the new metabolism inserted in their organism.

Having no fear of death, after the guidance she had received from her spiritual guide, Pilar volunteered for the process and after proving genetically compatible for it, underwent it. Eventually, Pilar developed the ability to transmit panic to her opponents, in combination with superhuman speed. Pilar was later given the humorous codename "Scaredycat" by her teammate, Will Deguchi. In retaliation, she gave him the codename "Scatterbrain", owing for his ability to project unfocused psychological conditions on many people at once.

Scaredycat, together with Scatterbrain and Toxyn, soon debuted publicly as the second generation of Morituri and met with their veteran teammates, before participating in their first official mission in San Francisco. Later, in the Morituri base, Scaredycat used her terminal to detect any strange messages coming in or out of the base. Soon, she intercepted a communication between the inventor of the Morituri process, Dr. Kimmo Tuolema and a member of the ruling Paedia World Government. Scaredycat was shocked when she realized the official actively discouraged Dr. Tuolema from searching for a cure for the mortal flaw of the Morituri process and instead instructed him to focus his researches on other things. Scaredycat immediately revealed this message to her teammate, Radian. Increasingly distrustful of her superiors and feeling that the Morituri were being treated as expendable pawns, Scaredycat later also confided her fears in the rest of the team, informing them of the exchange between Tuolema and his superior.

Death
Despite her suspicions about her superiors, Scaredycat remained on the team. Later, she began flirting with Scatterbrain and provoked him by inviting him to read her thoughts. At some point, she finally kissed Scatterbrain and the two began forming a romance. With his clairsentience, Scatterbrain knew she would be the next one to die of the Morituri effect, and informed her of the fact. Scaredycat faced the news quite stoically, stressing that she does not fear anything, including death. Her romance with Scatterbrain was cut short when he slipped into a self-induced coma.

The team then went on a mission in the Serengeti, in Africa, attacking some Hordians who were slaughtering animals there. Experiencing surges of power, Scaredycat began realizing that her time was up and used her surge to kill the Hordians, before passing away. She was seen in afterlife, being led by another spirit to meet the Morituri that had fallen before her.

Powers and abilities
Scaredycat had the ability to move at superhuman speed, her normal speed being increased by a tenfold, thanks to the Morituri process. She could also project fear, inducing shock and panic to her opponents. This effect did not work on machines. Like all recipients of the Morituri process, she also had enhanced strength and resilience. Like all team members, she also donned special boots, which enabled her to fly.

References

Comics characters introduced in 1987
Marvel Comics female superheroes
Marvel Comics superheroes
Marvel Comics characters who can move at superhuman speeds
Marvel Comics characters with superhuman strength
Strikeforce: Morituri